"Le Freak" is a 1978 funk / disco song by American R&B band Chic. It was the band's third single and first Billboard Hot 100 and R&B number-one hit song.  Along with the tracks "I Want Your Love" and "Chic Cheer", "Le Freak" scored number one on the disco charts for seven weeks. The single achieved sales of 7 million and also scored number seven in the UK Singles Chart.

Billboard magazine ranked it as the number 3 song for 1979. The song was ranked number 21 on Billboard magazine's top 100 songs of the first 55 years of the "Hot 100" chart. In 2018, it was selected for preservation in the National Recording Registry by the Library of Congress as being "culturally, historically, or artistically significant."

Lyrics
The lyrics mention "Stompin' at the Savoy", a 1933 song composed by Edgar Sampson. They also invite the listener to "Come on down to 54", that is, Studio 54, a popular nightclub in New York City at the time. This song is written in the key of A minor.

History
This song commemorates Studio 54 in New York City for its notoriously long customer waiting lines, exclusive clientele, and discourteous doormen. According to guitarist Nile Rodgers, the song was devised during New Year's Eve 1977, as a result of his and bassist Bernard Edwards' being refused entrance to Studio 54, where they had been invited by Grace Jones, due to her failure to notify the nightclub's staff. He said the lyrics of the refrain were originally "Fuck off!" rather than "Freak out!"; for the documentary "How to Make It in the Music Business", he said that 'fuck off' was what the doorman had said to him when he slammed the door on them; first it was changed to "freak off" after Rodgers mused that they wouldn't be able to say 'fuck off' on the radio, but that sounded "terrible", so he changed it to 'freak out'.

"Le Freak" was the first song to score the number one position on the Billboard Hot 100 three separate times.  It spent a total of six non-consecutive weeks at the position.

In 1987, an acid house-styled re-mix was issued under the title "Jack Le Freak". It reached number 18 in the United Kingdom, becoming Chic's last top 40 hit to date in that country.

MC Lyte sampled the song "Woo Woo (Freak Out)" featuring Nicci Gilbert of the group Brownstone, which first appeared on the soundtrack to the 1998 movie Woo and was also included on her album Seven & Seven, titled "Woo Woo (Party Time)", which released three months later.

Reception
Cash Box wrote it is "a handclapping disco song bolstered by solid bass work and airy vocals."

Track listing and formats
Atlantic 7" 3519, September 21, 1978
A. "Le Freak" (7" Edit) – 3:30
B. "Savoir Faire" – 4:57

Atlantic promo 12" DSKO 131, 1978 / Atlantic 12" DK 4700, 1978
A. "Le Freak" – 5:23
B. "Savoir Faire" – 4:57

Atlantic 12" DK 4620, 1978 / Atlantic Oldies promo 12" DSKO 178, 1979
A. "Le Freak" – 5:23
B. "You Can Get By" – 5:36

Personnel 

 Alfa Anderson – lead vocals
 Diva Gray – lead vocals
 David Lasley – vocals
 Luci Martin – vocals
 Luther Vandross – vocals
 Nile Rodgers – guitar, vocals
 Raymond Jones – Fender Rhodes electric piano
 Robert Sabino – clavinet, acoustic piano, electric piano
 Bernard Edwards – bass guitar, vocals
 Tony Thompson – drums
 Sammy Figueroa – percussion
 Jon Faddis – trumpet
 Ellen Seeling – trumpet
 Alex Foster – saxophone
 Jean Fineberg – saxophone
 Barry Rogers – trombone
 Jose Rossy – tubular bells
 The Chic Strings:
 Marianne Carroll – strings
 Cheryl Hong – strings
 Karen Milne – strings
 Gene Orloff – concert master

Charts

Weekly charts

Year-end charts

All-time charts

Certifications

In popular culture 
This song was used in a 2010 film Toy Story 3 scene in which Ken models his outfits for Barbie. It was also shown in the 2004 film Shrek 2, when they were partying in Shrek Swamp. This song also appears in the 1995 film Heavyweights during one of Tony Perkis’ exercise regimens with the struggling campers.

References

Songs about dancing
Songs about parties
Songs about nightclubs
1978 singles
1979 singles
Chic (band) songs
Disco songs
Billboard Hot 100 number-one singles
Cashbox number-one singles
Number-one singles in New Zealand
Number-one singles in Australia
Songs based on actual events
Songs written by Bernard Edwards
Songs written by Nile Rodgers
Song recordings produced by Nile Rodgers
Song recordings produced by Bernard Edwards
1978 songs
Atlantic Records singles
United States National Recording Registry recordings
Studio 54